The following are lists of existing Roman sites.

Sites

Belgium 

 List of Roman villas in Belgium

Spain
List of Roman sites in Spain

United Kingdom
Roman sites in the United Kingdom
Villas in England
Villas in Wales

See also
Roman Britain